Nawara Negm (Egyptian Arabic:نوارة نجم) (born in Cairo in 1973) is an Egyptian journalist, blogger and human rights activist based in Cairo, Egypt. Daughter of the Notable leftist Egyptian poet Ahmed Fouad Negm and Islamist Egyptian thinker and journalist Safinaz Kazem, she obtained her BA in English Language from the Faculty of Arts, Ain Shams University and has since worked for the Egyptian Nile Television Network (NTN) as a translator and news editor.

Writings 

In 2009 she published her first book, Esh A'rrih ('A Nest on the Wind';), a collection of articles, and in the same year she co-authored a book written exclusively by women writers under the title of Ana Ontha (I'm Female; Arabic: أنا أنثى).

Career 
Since her first year in university, from 1992 to 1993, Negm apprenticed as a journalist for Al-Sahabab, a monthly magazine issued by Al-Ahram Publishing House, then she moved to the English-language Al-Ahram Weekly, issued also by Al-Ahram. She worked as an apprentice for Nesf Al-Donia, a weekly women's magazine also printed by Al-Ahram. Sanaa Al-Bissy, the then editor-in-chief of the magazine decided to hire her but Ibrahim Nafie, ex-CEO of Al-Ahram, refused, saying that "she will be tenured when she ceases to be the daughter of Safinaz Kazem and Ahmed Fouad Negm".

So Nawara Negm left Al-Ahram to explore other opportunities, working for AlWafd (a daily newspaper owned and run by the opposition party Al-Wafd), El-Helwa magazine, and Al-Qahira (a weekly newspaper published by the Ministry of Culture). Soon after graduating in 1997, she joined the Nile Television Network.

Journalistic writings 
Negm contributed a weekly column every Sunday for AlWafd, later she joined Al-Dustour daily newspaper to which electronic version she still contributes. Among her most well-known contributions to the electronic Al-Dustour is an Arabic translation in December 2010 of selected WikiLeaks documents concerning Egypt and some other Arab countries.

Blog 

In 2006 Negm inaugurated her predominantly political blog titled Gabhet El Tahyees El Shaabeya (may be translated, imperfectly, as 'Popular Front of Sarcasm'). The header of the blog features a young girl biting barbed wire and includes a caption, both in Arabic and in English, that reads "Freedom is only for those who are ready to die."

During the Jan 25th Revolution, Negm was actively present in Tahrir Square Cairo and volunteered as a spokesperson of the revolution, reporting to the media, mainly Al Jazeera TV, her observations.

See also 
 Asmaa Mahfouz
 George Ishak
 Ahmed Ghanem
 Wael Ghonim
 Hossam el-Hamalawy
 Mona Seif
 Ahmed Harara

References

External links 
 Nawara Negm's blog
 Blogging for reform: the case of Egypt
 Nawara, bloggueuse frondeuse (French)
 Fanoos Encyclopedia: Nawara Negm

Journalists from Cairo
Human rights activists from Cairo
Democracy activists from Cairo
Egyptian bloggers
Egyptian women bloggers
Egyptian Muslims
Egyptian women activists
Egyptian revolutionaries
1973 births
Living people
Ain Shams University alumni